Monocyrtoceras is a genus of armenoceratids (Cephalopoda) from the Middle Silurian of North America (Wisconsin), with a gently curved shell and a siphuncle like that of Elrodoceras.

According to Teichert, 1964, in the Treatise part K, Monocyrtoceras along with Elrodoceras and Armenoceras forms one of the two branches of the Armenoceratidae.

References

 Curt Teichert, 1964. Actinoceratoidea, Treatise on Invertebrate Paleontology, Part K. Geological Society of America and University of Kansas Press.

Prehistoric nautiloid genera
Actinocerida